The Sustainable Nation-Building Party (Tongan: Paati Langafonua Tuʻuloa) was a political party in Tonga.  It was launched on August 4, 2007 in Auckland, New Zealand.

The party's president was Sione Fonua, an Auckland-based lawyer.  He plans to move to Tonga before the 2008 elections.

The party ran four candidates in the 2010 elections, but did not win any seats.  It intends to recruit more members and candidates and contest the next elections in 2014. The party did not run any candidates at the 2017 election, and is now defunct.

References

Political parties in Tonga
Political parties established in 2007
2007 establishments in Tonga